The Philip Buehner House is a house in southeast Portland, Oregon listed on the National Register of Historic Places. It is part of the Western Seminary Portland campus and is named Armstrong Hall.

Further reading

See also
 National Register of Historic Places listings in Southeast Portland, Oregon

References

External links
 
 Photos of pillar restoration at Armstrong Hall

1905 establishments in Oregon
Colonial Revival architecture in Oregon
Houses completed in 1905
Houses on the National Register of Historic Places in Portland, Oregon
Mount Tabor, Portland, Oregon
Portland Historic Landmarks